Harry is a male given name, a Middle English form of Henry. It is also a diminutive form of Harold, Harrison or Harvey.

People

 Harry Akst (1894–1963), American songwriter
 Harry Allen (designer) (born 1964), American industrial and interior designer
 Harry Allen (musician) (born 1966), American jazz tenor saxophonist
 Harry Altham (1888–1965), English cricketer
 Harry Anderson (disambiguation), multiple people
 Harry Andersson (1913–1996), Swedish football striker
 Harry Andrews (1911–1989), English film actor
 Harry Angping (born 1952), Filipino politician
 Harry Arter (born 1989), professional footballer
 Harry Atkinson (1831–1892), tenth Premier of New Zealand
 Harry Bateman (1882–1946), English mathematician
 Harry Bateman (artist) (1896–1976), English landscape painter
 Harry Bass (disambiguation), multiple people
 Harry Beck (1902–1974), English technical draughtsman
 Harry Beck (footballer) (1901–1979), English footballer
 Harry Belafonte (born 1927), American singer, songwriter, actor and social activist
 Harry Birtwistle (born 2003), Singaporean professional footballer
 Harry Blackmun (1908–1999), Associate Justice of the Supreme Court of the United States
 Harry Boland (1887–1922), Irish republican politician
 Harry Bong (1905–1987), Swedish Navy officer
 Harry Boykoff (1922–2001), American basketball player
 Harry Bresslau (1848–1926), German historian and scholar of state papers and of historical and literary muniments
 Harry Brewis (born 1991), English YouTube personality
 Harry Brook (born 1999), English international cricketer
 Harry Browne (1933–2006), American writer, politician, and investment analyst
 Harry Bush (American cricketer) (born 1989), American first-class cricketer
 Harry Bush (English cricketer) (1871–1942), English first-class cricketer
 Harry Callahan (photographer) (1912–1999), American photographer and educator
 Harry Caray (1914–1998), American radio and television sportscaster
 Harry Carey (actor) (1878–1947), American actor
 Harry Carpenter (1925–2010), British BBC sports commentator
 Harry Carpenter (bishop) (1901–1993), English bishop and theologian
 Harry Carpenter (priest), Anglican priest
 Henry Cort Harold Carpenter (1875–1940), British metallurgist and specialist on steels
 Harry Chapin (1942-1981), American folk singer-songwriter and philanthropist
 Harry Choates (1922–1951), American fiddler
 Harry Clarke (1889–1931), Irish stained-glass artist and book illustrator
 Harry Clarke (footballer, born 2001) (born 2001), English professional footballer
 Harry Cole (journalist) (born 1986), British journalist
 Harry Connick Jr. (born 1967), American singer, pianist, composer, actor, and television host
 Harry Cothliff (1916–1976), English footballer
 Harry Crider (born 1999), American football player
 Harry Corbett (1918–1989), English magician, puppeteer and television presenter
 Harry H. Corbett (1925–1982), English actor and comedian
 Harry Crosby (1898–1929), American heir, World War I veteran, bon vivant, poet, and publisher
 Harry Crosby (businessman) (born 1958), American investment banker and former actor
 Harry Daghlian (1921–1945), American physicist
 Harry Danning, American Major League Baseball All Star catcher
 Harry Davenport (1866–1949), American actor
 Harry Dias Bandaranaike (1822-1901), first Sinhala and first indigenous Puisne Justice and acting Chief Justice of the Supreme Court of Sri Lanka
 Harry Edward (1898–1973), British runner
 Harry Eisenstat (1915–2003), Major League Baseball player
 Harry Enfield (born 1961), English comedian, actor, writer and director
 Henry Enfield (1849-1923), English cricketer
 Harry Enten (born 1988), American journalist
 Harry Feldman (1919–1962), Major League Baseball pitcher
 Harry Wickwire Foster, senior Canadian Army officer who commanded two Canadian divisions during World War II, one of the principal commanders of Aleutian Islands campaign and Operation Cottage
 Harry Fox (1882–1959), American vaudeville dancer, actor and comedian born Arthur Carringford
 Harry Frankfurt (born 1929), American philosopher
 Harrison Garside (born 1997), Australian boxer
 Harry Geithner (born 1976), Colombian actor, film director and producer
 Harry Gesner (1925–2022), American architect
 Harry Gideonse (1901–1985), American President of Brooklyn College, and Chancellor of the New School for Social Research
 Harry Giles (basketball) (born 1998), American professional basketball player
 Harry Giles (footballer) (1911–1986), Australian rules footballer
 Harry Gilmer (1926–2016), American football halfback and quarterback
 Harry Goodsir (1819–c. 1848), Scottish physician and naturalist
 Harry Goonatilake (1929–2008), 5th Commander of the Sri Lanka Air Force
 Harry Gottsacker (born 1999), American racing driver
 Harry Grant (cyclist) (1906-1993), British racing cyclist
 Harry Grant (footballer) (born 1993), English footballer
 Harry Grant (racing driver) (1877–1915), American auto racing driver
 Harry Grant (rugby league) (born 1998), Australian professional rugby league footballer
 Harry Gration (1950–2022), English journalist and broadcaster
 Harry Gregg (1932–2020), Northern Irish professional footballer and manager
 Harry Gregson-Williams (born 1961), British composer, conductor, orchestrator, and record producer
 Harry Grindell Matthews, English inventor who claimed to have invented a death ray in the 1920s
 Harry Groener (born 1951), German-born American actor and dancer
 Harry Guardino (1925–1995), American actor
 Harry Gurney (born 1986), English cricketer
 Harry Gwala (1920-1995), South African African National Congress and Communist Party of South Africa revolutionary
 Harry Gyles (1880–1959), Australian rules footballer
 Harry Harris (boxer) (1880–1959), American world champion bantamweight
 Harry Harrison (writer) (1925–2012), American science fiction author
 Harry Hollins (1932–1989), American politician
 Harry Houdini (1874–1926), American escapologist and stunt performer born Erik Weisz
 Harry Jerome (1940–1982), Canadian track and field sprinter and physical education teacher
 Harry Kalas (1936-2009), American sportscaster
 Harry Kane (born 1993),  English footballer
 Harry Kewell (born 1978), Australian association football coach, manager and former player
 Harry King (disambiguation), multiple people
 Harry Kinnard, American general officer, one of the principal commanders of Pleiku Campaign
 Harry Knowles (born 1971), American film critic and writer
 Harry Krakow (1910–1991), birth name of King Levinsky, American heavyweight boxer
 Harold Walter Kroto, known as Harry Kroto (1939–2016), English chemist
 Harry Landis (1926–2022), British actor and director
 Harry Richard Landis (1899–2008), American First World War veteran
 Harry Langdon (1884–1944), American comedian
 Harry Lauder (1870– 1950), Scottish singer and comedian
 Harry Lawtey (born 1996), English actor
 Harry Lennix (born 1964), American actor
 Harry Lewis (boxer) (1886–1956), American world champion welterweight born Harry Besterman
 Harry Lewis (born 1996) W2S (big bog)
 Harry Litman, American lawyer, law professor and political commentator
 Harry Lloyd (born 1983), English actor
 Harry Lorraine (American actor) (1873–1935), American silent film actor
 Harry Lorraine (English actor) (1885–1970), actor in English silent films
 Harry Lorayne (born 1926), American magician
 Harry Luff (1856-1916), American Major League Baseball player
 Harry Maguire (born 1993), English footballer
 Harry Manser (1874–1955), justice of the Maine Supreme Judicial Court
 Harry Michael (born 1992), Australian rapper and songwriter, known professionally as Masked Wolf
 Harry S. Morgan (1945–2011), German director and producer of pornographic movies
 Harry Mosby (1945–1993), Australian Paralympic athlete from the Torres Strait
 Sir Harry Burrard Neale, British officer of the Royal Navy and Member of Parliament for Lymington
 Harry Ord (1819–1885), British colonial administrator 
 Harry Pace (1884–1943), American music publisher and insurance executive
 Harry Partch (1901–1974), American composer, music theorist, and creator of unique musical instruments
 Harry Patch (1898–2009), English supercentenarian, briefly the oldest man in Europe, and the last surviving trench combat soldier of the First World War from any country
 Harry Peglar (1812 – c. 1849), English seaman
 Harry Prendergast (1834–1913), British general, one of the principal commanders of Third Anglo-Burmese War
 Harry Redknapp (born 1947), English footballer and manager
 Harry Reems (1947–2013), American pornographic film actor
 Harry Roque (born 1966), Filipino lawyer and former law professor
 Harry Sacksioni (born 1950), composer and guitar virtuoso of Dutch origin
 Herschel Saltzman, known as Harry Saltzman (1915–1994), Canadian theatre and film producer
 Harry Secombe (1921–2001), Welsh comedian, actor, singer and television presenter
 Harry Seidler (1923–2006), Austrian-born Australian architect
 Harry Gordon Selfridge (1858–1947), American retail magnate
 Harry Shum (born 1966), Chinese computer scientist
 Harry Shum Jr. (born 1982), Costa Rican-American actor, singer, dancer, and choreographer
 Harry Smith (disambiguation), multiple people
 Harry Souttar (born 1998), professional footballer
 Harry Dean Stanton (1926–2017), American actor, musician, and singer
 Harry Styles (born 1994), British singer, songwriter, actor as well as member of the boy band One Direction.
 Harry Stafford (disambiguation), multiple people
 Harry Sugiyama (born 1985), Japanese television personality and model
 Harry Swartz (born 1996), American soccer player
 Harry Taylor (disambiguation), multiple people
 Harry Alan Towers (1920–2009), British-born radio and independent film producer and screenwriter
 Harry Traver (1877-1961), American roller coaster and amusement ride engineer
 Harry Treadaway (born 1984), English actor
 Harry S. Truman (1884–1972), 33rd President of the United States
 Harry Vickers (disambiguation), multiple people
 Harry Warner (1881–1958), American cartoonist and one of the founders of Warner Brothers
 Harry Weese (1915–1998), American architect
 Harry Wolff (booking agent) (1890–1934), booking agent for theater and vaudeville performers in the early 20th century
 Harry Wright (disambiguation), multiple people
 Harry Winks (born 1993) English footballer
 Harry Winston (1896–1978), American jeweler
 H. J. Sterling (Harry John Sterling; 1882–1959), Canadian ice hockey administrator
 Prince Harry, Duke of Sussex (born 1984), second son of King Charles III of the United Kingdom

Fictional characters
 Harry, a main character in Harry and His Bucket Full of Dinosaurs
 Harry Potter, the title character in  Harry Potter series by J. K. Rowling
 Sheriff Harry S. Truman, a character in the American television series Twin Peaks
 Harry Callahan, Clint Eastwood's character in the Dirty Harry film series
 Harry Callahan, a minor character in Diane Duane's Young Wizards series
 Harry Lyme (Joe Pesci), an antagonist in the Home Alone series
 Harry Solomon, a character on the sitcom 3rd Rock from the Sun
 Harry Fisher, a former character in the BBC drama Waterloo Road
 Harry Coleman, a character in the 2003 film Freaky Friday
 Harry Bailey, George Bailey's younger brother in the movie It's A Wonderful Life
 Harry Haller, the protagonist in Hermann Hesse's Steppenwolf
 Sir Harry Pearce, a character in the BBC spy drama Spooks
 Sir Harry Paget Flashman, main and eponymous character in the "Flashman" series by George MacDonald Fraser
 Harry Mason, protagonist in the 1999 survival horror video game Silent Hill.
 Harry Sullivan, a companion to Tom Baker's Doctor in the British television series Doctor Who
 Harry Dresden, the title character Jim Butcher's urban fantasy series, The Dresden Files and in The Dresden Files (TV series)
 Harry the Hobo, a character played by Bilal Shahid in the British web series Corner Shop Show
 Harry the Horse, a character in the Broadway Musical Guys and Dolls
 Harry Hewitt, a character from Coronation Street
 Harry Osborn, a character from Spider-Man
 Harry Sultenfuss, a character 1991 and 1994 American coming-of-age comedy-drama movies My Girl and My Girl 2 played by Dan Aykroyd
 Harry Wells, a character from the Arrowverse franchise
 Harry Keogh, the main character in Brian Lumley's series of horror novels, Necroscope

References

English masculine given names
Masculine given names
Hypocorisms
fr:Harry